The Hong Kong five hundred dollar note was first issued in undated from the 1860s by the Oriental Bank Corporation, the Standard Chartered Bank (Hong Kong) but a confirmed date for this bank is 1879, followed by The Hongkong and Shanghai Banking Corporation in 1877, the Mercantile Bank in 1948 and the Bank of China in 1994. The Specimens are known from the Agra and Masterman's Bank and the Asiatic Banking Corporation between 1862-66. The National Bank of China issued theirs in the 1890s. There was a continuous issue till the Second World War in different colours and dimensions, they were reissued from 1946. The Mercantile bank ceased issue of this denomination after 1959. There was a standardisation of size in 1979 when the Chartered Bank reduced the size to that similar to HSBC. The colour was made uniform in 2003 when brown for all banknotes was adopted.

References

Ma Tak Wo 2004, Illustrated Catalogue of Hong Kong Currency, Ma Tak Wo Numismatic Co., LTD Kowloon Hong Kong. 

Banknotes of Hong Kong
Five-hundred-base-unit banknotes